Broderie de Fontenoy-le-Château  is a museum in Vosges, France. Opened in 1979, it is noted for its embroidery.

External links
 Musée de la Broderie, de la Métallurgie et du Patrimoine - official site

Museums in Vosges (department)
Museums established in 1979
Textile museums
1979 establishments in France
Embroidery